Hemiphyllodactylus goaensis, the Goan slender gecko, is a species of gecko. It is endemic to India.

References

Hemiphyllodactylus
Reptiles described in 2021
Endemic fauna of India
Reptiles of India